Pavlos Polakis (born 1965) is a Greek surgeon and politician.

Since 2010, Polakis has been the mayor of Sfakia on the island of Crete, being reelected in 2014. In the January 2015 legislative election, he became a member of the Hellenic Parliament for Chania. He was appointed to the First Cabinet of Alexis Tsipras as Alternate Minister of the Interior and Administrative Reconstruction. Reelected in the September 2015 legislative election, Polakis was appointed Alternate Minister of Health in the Second Tsipras Cabinet.

Political career 
He studied at the Medical School of the National and Kapodistrian University of Athens, where he obtained the qualification of general surgeon-entatologist. Initially, he joined the KNE, from which he left in 1989 after the participation of the KKE in the government of Tzannis Tzannetakis and later joined the NAP. During his student years, he was a member of the Grigoris Lambrakis Medical Students' Association and a member of the Central Council of the National Student Union of Greece. After completing his studies, as a resident and as a specialist, he was elected member of the Board of Directors of the Athens and Piraeus Hospital Doctors' Association and of the General Council of the Federation of Hospital Doctors' Associations of Greece. He developed trade union activity at the General State Hospital of Nice, and participated in a humanitarian aid transport operation in Yugoslavia in 1999.

In the 2010 local elections, he was elected mayor of Sfakia in the first round, winning 60.97% of the votes, prevailing over his runner-up Yannis Hiotakis who received 39.03% of the votes. In the 2014 local elections, he was re-elected as the only candidate with 94% of the vote. His mayoral term was marked by several public works, as well as his opposition to the destruction of chemical weapons used during the Syrian Civil War off the Mediterranean Sea.

He was elected deputy for Chania with SYRIZA in the elections of January 2015 (when he served as Deputy Minister of Interior and Administrative Reconstruction), September 2015 (when he served as Deputy Minister of Health) and July 2019, when SYRIZA was the opposition party. In the July 2019 elections, he was elected first in cross votes for SYRIZA.

Governments SYRIZA 
On 17 July 2015, he accepted Alexis Tsipras' proposal to take over as Deputy Minister of Interior and Administrative Reconstruction, following a reshuffle announced by the government. With the election victory of SYRIZA in September 2015, he was appointed as Deputy Minister of Health, with Andreas Xanthos as Chief Minister. In 2018, he announced the recruitment of 19,500 employees in the NHS.

Family and personal life 
Pavlos Polakis is married to Dora Douka who he met during his student days at the University of Athens Medical School. Together they have two daughters Stavroula and Persa.

Controversy
He has been involved in verbal disputes with journalists, such as in December 2015 at a press conference where he made references to issues of interference. In April 2016, referring to the same journalist, he said that "I had to put him three meters under the ground", which caused a reaction. 

He has also been repeatedly criticized for violations of the anti-smoking law in parliament. While serving as Deputy Minister of Health, he was criticized by EU Health Commissioner Vytenis Andriukaitis for smoking at a ministry press conference. 

In July 2019, Polakis had his parliamentary immunity revoked after being accused of illegally wiretapping a phone conversation with the Governor of the Central Bank of Greece. He has also been accused of slander by the head of the workers' union of the Greece Center for Disease Control and Prevention (KEELPNO)

Polakis' personal attack on ND's candidate for the European Parliament Stelios Kymouropoulos for his appointment to the NHS as a disabled person (suffering from Spinal Muscular Atrophy) caused a reaction. 

Another area of criticism was Pavlos Polakis' dispute with journalist Yannis Kourtakis who accused of collecting funds given to his media by the Center for Disease Control and Prevention (KEELPNO). Journalist Yannis Kourtakis filed a lawsuit with a request to lift the MP's immunity, which was rejected. After the intense ''attack'' that followed from Polakis to the journalist, another lawsuit against the former minister resulted in the lifting of his immunity.

Stance on Vaccinations 

In 2021 he announced publicly that he will not get vaccinated against Covid-19. Polakis came under heavy scrutiny in June 2021, as a result of controversial social media posts shared from his accounts, where he openly criticised the safety of COVID-19 vaccines. The government of New Democracy called Alexis Tsipras to take a stance on the issue, whilst Facebook blocked Polakis' account for sharing conspiracy theories. Ultimately, Alexis Tsipras also criticised Polakis, whilst other prominent Greek politicians and journalists called his wording 'dangerous', 'irresponsible' and vaccine hesitant. He received a COVID-19 vaccine in early September, 2021.

References

External links 
 

People from Sfakia
Living people
Democritus University of Thrace alumni
Greek surgeons
Independent politicians in Greece
Syriza politicians
Mayors of places in Greece
Greek MPs 2015 (February–August)
Greek MPs 2015–2019
Government ministers of Greece
Politicians from Crete
1965 births
20th-century surgeons
Greek MPs 2019–2023